A three-legged race is a running event involving pairs of participants running with the left leg of one runner strapped to the right leg of another runner. The objective is for the partners to beat the other contestant pairs to the finish line.

The longest distance ever run three-legged in 24 hours is 117.1km (72.7 miles) and was achieved by Gary Shaughnessy (Tadley, England) and Andy Tucker ( Tadley, England ), at Silchester on 9/10th October 2021. https://www.guinnessworldrecords.com/world-records/longest-distance-run-three-legged-in-24-hours .This also happens to be the longest ever distance run three-legged. Gary Shaughnessy and Andy Tucker also broke the 12 hour record on the same day.

The world record for the most pairs in a three-legged race is 649, set in 2013 on the Isle of Man. An August 2014 attempt in Canberra organised by National Rugby League team Canberra Raiders failed; only 543 pairs competed.

References

External links
World Records for Three-Legged Running

https://www.guinnessworldrecords.com/world-records/longest-distance-run-three-legged-in-24-hours

 Largest Three-legged Race (Most Pairs)

Children's games
Games of physical skill
Novelty running